Colliex may refer to:

Christian Colliex (b. 1944), French physicist
Jeanson-Colliex, French aircraft manufacturer
Maurice Colliex ( 1880 - 1954 ), French aviation pioneer